Monolluma is a genus of plants in the  Apocynaceae, first described as a genus in 1995. It contains only one known species, Monolluma quadrangula, native to Middle East.

formerly included
Monolluma cicatricosa (Deflers) Plowes, synonym of  Caralluma cicatricosa (Deflers) N.E.Br..

References

Asclepiadoideae
Monotypic Apocynaceae genera